The Miami Marlins are a professional Major League Baseball based in Miami, Florida. The Marlins are members of the National League East division in MLB, joining in 1993 as an expansion team. In baseball, the head coach of a team is called the manager, or more formally, the field manager. The duties of the team manager include team strategy and leadership on and off the field. The Marlins have employed fifteen different managers (two interim) since their founding as the Florida Marlins in 1993, with three leading then to the postseason that has resulted in two World Series championships (1997, 2003).

The Marlins' first manager was Rene Lachemann, who led the team from its creation in 1993 through part of the 1996 season. After Cookie Rojas managed for one game, John Boles served as manager for the final 75 games of the 1996 season. Jim Leyland took over the franchise for the next two seasons, and in the process led the Marlins to their first World Series championship in 1997. In 1999, Boles took over and started his second stint as manager of the Marlins, which lasted until partway through the 2001 season. Tony Pérez was interim manager for the rest of 2001; Pérez is the only Miami Marlins manager who is a member of the National Baseball Hall of Fame, inducted as a player in 2000.

Jeff Torborg took over as manager to start the 2002 season, and served for  seasons. Jack McKeon took over and guided the franchise to their second World Series championship in 2003. He served until the end of the 2005 season, and was replaced by Joe Girardi, who was manager for one full season, in 2006. : Fredi González took over from Girardi and managed the team from 2007 until partway through 2010
 Edwin Rodríguez managed the Marlins from 2010 to 2011, and after Brandon Hyde managed for one game, McKeon returned for a second stint as manager. After McKeon retired, Ozzie Guillén took over as manager of the Marlins for the 2012 season, the team's first as the Miami Marlins. Ozzie Guillén was fired on October 23, 2012 after finishing in last place; he has the lowest winning percentage for any Marlin manager who managed a full season. The current manager is Don Mattingly (hired in 2016), who also holds the record for most victories as a Marlin manager along with games mananged and lost.

Key

Managers
Statistics current through 2022 season

Managers with multiple tenures

References

 
Miami Marlins
Managers